The Citroën Jumpy (badged Citroën Dispatch in some countries) is a light commercial van jointly developed by Fiat Group and PSA Group (currently Stellantis), and mainly manufactured by Sevel, a joint venture between the two companies since 1994. The Jumpy was also sold as the Peugeot Expert and Fiat Scudo beginning in 1995.

All three models were facelifted in March 2004 before being replaced by new, second-generation models in 2007. The redesigned models again shared the same design and engineering, with subtle trim changes between each brand. The second generation received a small facelift in February 2012 and from July 2013, Toyota began sales of a rebadged version called the Toyota Proace.

In December 2015, Citroën, Peugeot and Toyota unveiled their new generation of these vehicles in people carrying-specifications called the Citroën SpaceTourer and Peugeot Traveller, with Toyota retaining the Proace name. The commercial versions premiered later, retaining the Peugeot Expert and Citroën Jumpy names.

In July 2016, the Fiat Scudo was replaced by a second generation of the Fiat Talento, a rebadged Renault Trafic. From the 2019 model year, the Jumpy has been rebadged as the Opel/Vauxhall Vivaro, replacing the previous Vivaro model, which, from 1997 to 2018, had been based on the Renault Trafic. From the 2022 model year, the Jumpy has also been rebadged as the Fiat Scudo.


First generation (1994)

Citroën released the first-generation Jumpy in June 1994, naming the model "Dispatch" in English-speaking markets. Peugeot and Fiat followed with their rebadged models in July 1995 and February 1996 respectively. The vans differ little technically and visually, an example of badge engineering.

They share mechanicals and body structure with the Sevel Nord Eurovans minivans: the Citroën Evasion (Synergie), Fiat Ulysse, Lancia Zeta, and Peugeot 806. The engines available throughout the models do differ, with the Fiat getting its own engines distinct from those fitted to the Citroën and Peugeot. The Fiat Scudo replaced the first generation of the Fiat Talento.

Facelift 
The model received a facelift in 2004, which changed most of the front end including the bumper and bonnet; for the first time, the headlamps were combined with the indicators rather than being a separate set of lights.

Engines 

 Only for Scudo Combinato

Second generation (G9; 2006)

The second generation offered increased cargo space and more body styles over the previous generation. It was launched in November 2006, with deliveries beginning in principal markets in January 2007. The Citroën is available in 90 bhp,  and  versions with the option of four diesel engines or one petrol engine.

The Peugeot Expert II was launched in January 2007, with the addition of a people carrier model, the Tepee. The PSA/Fiat joint venture ended in March 2016.

Facelift 
The model received a slight facelift in February 2012, which changed the grille and front bumper. From July 2013, Toyota began sales of a rebadged version called Toyota Proace.

Engines

Third generation (K0; 2016)

At the 2016 Geneva Motor Show, Citroën, Peugeot and Toyota revealed their latest generation of their respective vans. With this new generation the vans became more contemporary, and the Citroën and Peugeot models gained new names for the passenger versions: Citroën SpaceTourer and Peugeot Traveller. Toyota partially retained the Proace name, calling their version Proace Verso.

Commercial variants have been released in March 2016, under the Citroën Jumpy, Peugeot Expert and Toyota Proace names.

In light of the PSA Group takeover of Opel/Vauxhall in March 2017, Renault gave formal notice of cessation of the agreement to be able to produce the then-current Opel/Vauxhall Vivaro derivative model, based on the Renault Trafic, under license. In 2019, Opel/Vauxhall switched to the PSA van platform for the Vivaro.

The Fiat Scudo and Ulysse nameplates were revived in 2022 using the PSA van platform, replacing the also Renault Trafic-based Talento.

In January 2022, Stellantis stopped marketing the internal combustion versions of its passenger vans in Europe (Switzerland and Balkan countries excepted). This decision is mainly motivated by a decision to reduce the average  emissions of vehicles marketed by the company in Europe in accordance with the CAFE (Corporate Average Fuel Economy) regulations set up by the European Union. As a result, the SpaceTourer, Traveller and Zafira Life are now only offered in their 100% electric and hydrogen versions. Panel van models are not affected by this change, nor are Toyota-badged models, as the Japanese manufacturer is in line with the objectives of the CAFE regulations.

Production 
Since 2017, both Citroën Jumpy and Peugeot Expert are assembled as CKD in Montevideo, Uruguay. As of October 2019, Nordex S.A. has produced 13,000 units, with most of them being exported to Brazil and Argentina.

In March 2018, PSA started the production of the Peugeot Expert and Citroën Jumpy in its Russian plant, in Kaluga. The next month began the production of the Traveller and SpaceTourer in the same factory. In December 2019, the Opel Zafira Life joined them on Kaluga assembly lines, followed by the Vivaro a few months later.

In April 2018, PSA announced that the Luton plant would begin production of the third generation Jumpy from the beginning of 2019, which would also be badged as the Opel/Vauxhall Zafira Life/Vivaro Life/Vivaro to replace the Trafic-based Vivaro.

In February 2022, Stellantis began exporting part of the production of the Russian plant in Kaluga to Western Europe, where Citroën, Peugeot and Opel models are manufactured. In March 2022, Stellantis halted exports from Russia following Moscow's invasion of Ukraine, putting an end to the short-lived export program from Kaluga.

Special trims

GS
In October 2022, the Vauxhall Vivaro received a sporty GS trim option alongside a more powerful diesel engine.

Electric versions 
While the e-Berlingo is fitted with a 50 kW-hr battery, the e-Jumpy (and its rebadged cousins) also offer a larger 75 kW-hr battery as an option. The vans are fitted with a 7.4 kW (AC) charger as standard, and an 11 kW (AC) charger is available as an option.

Peugeot e-Expert/e-Traveller 
In 2019, Peugeot introduced an electric version of their Expert van called e-Expert which shares the same platform as the Vivaro-e. They later introduced an electric variant of the passenger Traveller called e-Traveller in June 2020.

Compared to the conventional diesel versions, there are some cosmetic changes such as blanked-off grille, instrument cluster which includes a battery charge-level gauge and new graphics for it infotainment system.

Citroën ë-Jumpy/ë-Dispatch/ë-SpaceTourer 
The Citroën ë-Jumpy (ë-Dispatch) is largely similar to the Peugeot e-Expert cargo van, while the Citroën ë-SpaceTourer is similar to the Peugeot e-Traveller passenger van.

Opel Vivaro-e/Zafira-e Life 
In April 2020, Opel revealed the all-electric Vivaro-e. The Vivaro-e is available in three lengths and offers a payload capacity of up to 1,275 kg (2,811 lbs). In the UK, the vehicle is sold under the Vauxhall brand.

The passenger model is called the Opel Zafira-e Life.

On 18 May 2021, Opel revealed the Vivaro-e Hydrogen. This new version has a payload of 1100 kg (compared to 1200 kg for the Vivaro-e and 1400 kg for the Vivaro). The Vivaro-e Hydrogen combines a 45 kW fuel cell with a 10.5 kW lithium-ion battery. The hydrogen storage tanks are supplied by Symbio, a joint venture between Michelin and Faurecia. Peugeot then presented its e-Expert Hydrogen. These vans are manufactured at the Valenciennes plant and converted to hydrogen at the former Opel plant in Rüsselsheim.

Toyota Proace Electric 
The Proace Electric, available in passenger (Verso) and cargo versions, is a Toyota-badged twin of the electric vans from Groupe PSA described above. The Proace Electric is the first all-electric passenger vehicle offered under the Toyota brand in Europe.

Fiat E-Scudo/E-Ulysse 
In March 2022, Fiat unveiled the E-Ulysse, a battery electric derivative of its passenger van. The cargo version is called the E-Scudo.

Hydrogen
On May 18, 2021, Opel presented the Vivaro-e Hydrogen. The Vivaro-e Hydrogen combines a 45 kW fuel cell with a 10.5 kW lithium-ion battery. The hydrogen cylinders are supplied by Symbio, a joint venture between Michelin and Faurecia. Peugeot presented its e-Expert Hydrogen a few days later and Citroën its ë-Jumpy Hydrogen. These vehicles are manufactured at the Valenciennes plant then converted to hydrogen at the former Opel plant in Rüsselheim.

Engines

Gallery

Commercial versions

Passenger versions

Sales and production

References

External links 

Citroen Dispatch website (UK)
Peugeot Expert website (UK)
Vauxhall Vivaro website (UK)

Jumpy
Front-wheel-drive vehicles
Minibuses
Police vehicles
Vans
Vehicles introduced in 1995